FC Yassy is a Kazakhstani football club that was based in Shymkent, Kazakhstan. They were members of the Kazakhstan First Division in 2005. But were not able to finish that season due to financial reasons.

History

Names
1990 : Founded as Montazhnik
1993 : Renamed Yassy
2003 : Renamed Yassy-Rakhat
2004 : Renamed Yassy-Sayram
2005 : Renamed Yassy

Honours
Kazakhstan First Division (1): 2003

References

External links
Lyakhov.kz: Club info, 2004 

Yassi, FC
1992 establishments in Kazakhstan